Enchytraeida is an order of annelids belonging to the class Clitellata.

Families:
 Enchytraeidae
 Propappidae
 Randiellidae

References

Annelids